Marko Yannik Stamm (born 30 August 1988) is a German male former water polo player. He was part of the Germany men's national water polo team at the 2008 Summer Olympics. He also competed at the 2011 World Aquatics Championships.

References

External links
 

1988 births
Living people
German male water polo players
Place of birth missing (living people)
Olympic water polo players of Germany
Water polo players at the 2008 Summer Olympics